George Henry Heinke (July 22, 1882 – January 2, 1940) was a Nebraska Republican politician.

Early life
He was born on a farm on July 22, 1882 near Dunbar, Nebraska and moved in 1889 to Douglas, Nebraska, in 1891 to San Angelo, Texas, and in 1894 to Talmage, Nebraska.  He graduated from the University of Nebraska–Lincoln College of Law and passed the bar in 1908.  He set up practice in Nebraska City, Nebraska.

Career
He became the prosecuting attorney for Otoe County, Nebraska from 1919 to 1923 and 1927 to 1935.  In 1939, he was elected to the Seventy-sixth United States Congress and served from January 3, 1939 until January 2, 1940.

Death
On January 2, 1940 while en route to Washington, D.C. he died in a car crash in Morrilton, Arkansas.  He is buried in Wyuka Cemetery in Nebraska City.

See also
 List of United States Congress members who died in office (1900–49)

References
 
 
 
 
 "Memorial Services held in the House of Representatives of the United States, together with remarks presented in eulogy of George Henry Heinke late a Representative from Nebraska frontispiece 1941"

1882 births
1940 deaths
People from Nebraska City, Nebraska
University of Nebraska College of Law alumni
District attorneys in Nebraska
Road incident deaths in Arkansas
Republican Party members of the United States House of Representatives from Nebraska
20th-century American politicians
20th-century American lawyers